Kertu is a village in Shamli in Uttar Pradesh, India.  It is situated on the border of Uttar Pradesh on state highway-82 (Shamli to Karnal, 20  km from each town).  Its population is more than 5000, and its main religions are Hinduism, Islam, and Sikhism. Its main castes are Brahman, Muslim Gujjar, and Jat. It has a bank named Allahabad Bank, a super specialty government hospital, and a society for seeds.

Development and infrastructure
Shamli, the main city of the district, has the Yamnotri Expressway, a four-lane highway, which links Delhi to the Uttarkashi District. National Highway 1, a six-lane expressway linking Delhi to the Amritsar-Attari border in Punjab, passes through Karnal. The Karnal-Meerut Highway passes through Kertu.

Villages in Shamli district